Otto Max Helmuth von Glasenapp (8 September 1891 – 25 June 1963) was a German indologist and religious scholar who taught as a professor at the University of Konigsberg in East Prussia (1928–1944) and Tübingen (1946–1959).

Works
Die Lehre vom Karman in der Philosophie der Jainas nach den Karmagranthas. Phil. Diss. (Bonn), Harrassowitz, Leipzig 1915.
Der Hinduismus. Religion und Gesellschaft im heutigen Indien. Kurt Wolff, München 1922.
Madhvas Philosophie des Vishnu-Glaubens. Mit einer Einleitung über Madhva und seine Schule. Schroeder, Bonn 1923.
Indien. (Der indische Kulturkreis in Einzeldarstellungen, hg. von Karl Döhring), Georg Müller, München 1925.
Der Jainismus. Eine indische Erlösungsreligion. Alf Häger, Berlin 1925.
Brahma und Buddha. Die Religionen Indiens in ihrer geschichtlichen Entwicklung. Deutsche Buchgemeinschaft, Berlin 1926.
Religiöse Reformbewegungen im heutigen Indien. Hinrichs, Leipzig 1928.
Heilige Stätten Indiens. Die Wallfahrtsorte der Hindus, Jainas und Buddhisten, ihre Legenden und ihr Kultus. Georg Müller, München 1928.
Britisch-Indien und Ceylon. (Weltpolitische Bücherei, Band 14) Zentralverlag, Berlin 1929.
Die Literaturen Indiens von ihren Anfängen bis zur Gegenwart. Athenaion, Potsdam 1929.
Der Buddhismus in Indien und im Fernen Osten. Schicksale und Lebensformen einer Erlösungsreligion. Atlantis, Berlin 1936.
Buddhistische Mysterien. Die geheimen Lehren und Riten des Diamant-Fahrzeugs. Spemann, Stuttgart 1940.
Die Religionen Indiens. Kröner, Stuttgart 1943.
Die Weisheit des Buddha. Bühler, Baden-Baden 1946.
Der Stufenweg zum Göttlichen. Shankaras Philosophie der All-Einheit. Bühler, Baden-Baden 1948.
Die Philosophie der Inder. Eine Einführung in ihre Geschichte und ihre Lehren. Kröner, Stuttgart 1949.
Die fünf großen Religionen, 2 Bände:
Band 1: Brahmanismus. Buddhismus. Chinesischer Universalismus. Diederichs, Düsseldorf/Köln 1951.
Band 2: Islam und Christentum. Diederichs, Düsseldorf/Köln 1952.
Die Religionen der Menschheit. Ihre Gegensätze und ihre Übereinstimmungen. (Unesco Schriftenreihe, Band 6), Wilhelm Frick, Wien 1954.
Kant und die Religionen des Ostens. Holzner, Kitzingen-Main 1954.
Buddhismus und Gottesidee. Die buddhistischen Lehren von den überweltlichen Wesen und Mächten und ihre religionsgeschichtlichen Parallelen. Akademie der Wissenschaften und der Literatur, Mainz 1954.
Der Pfad zur Erleuchtung. Grundtexte der buddhistischen Heilslehre. Diederichs, Düsseldorf/Köln 1956.
Glaube und Ritus der Hochreligionen in vergleichender Übersicht. (Fischer Bücherei 346), S. Fischer, Frankfurt am Main 1960.
Meine Lebensreise. Menschen, Länder und Dinge, die ich sah. Brockhaus, Wiesbaden 1964.
Schriftenverzeichnis
Zoltán Károlyi: Helmuth von Glasenapp-Bibliographie, Harrassowitz, Wiesbaden 1968, .
Kleine Schriften
Volker Moeller, Heinz Bechert (eds.): Helmuth von Glasenapp: Ausgewählte Kleine Schriften. Mit einem Nachtrag zur Helmuth von Glasenapp-Bibliographie von Zoltán Károlyi, Harrassowitz, Wiesbaden 1980, .

References

Bibliography

External links
 

German Indologists
1891 births
1963 deaths
Academic staff of the University of Königsberg